Constantine Doukas Komnenos Palaiologos (1278/81–1334/35) was a Byzantine prince of the Palaiologos dynasty, who received the supreme title of Despot and served as provincial governor.

Life
Constantine was the second son of Emperor Andronikos II Palaiologos and his first wife, Empress Anna of Hungary. He was born sometime between 1278 and 1281. In 1294 he was named Despot, the highest court rank in the Byzantine Empire, on the occasion of his first marriage to Eudokia, the daughter of Theodore Mouzalon. 

In 1305, he fought in the disastrous Battle of Apros against the Catalan Company under the command of his oldest brother, the co-emperor Michael IX. In 1317, he intercepted his half-sister Simonida, the queen-consort  of Serbia, who wished to retire to a monastery after the death of her mother, Irene of Montferrat, and returned her to the Serbs. At about this time he married a second time, again to a Eudokia, but both his marriages were childless. He nevertheless had one illegitimate son, Michael Katharos. 

In 1319 he served as governor of Avlona, and in 1321–1322 as governor of Thessalonica. It was in this position that the outbreak of the Byzantine civil war of 1321–1328 found him; in 1322 he was imprisoned by his nephew, Andronikos III Palaiologos, at Didymoteichon. Constantine then became a monk, under the monastic name Kallistos. He died in 1334/35.

References

Sources
 

13th-century births
1330s deaths
14th-century Byzantine people
13th-century Byzantine people
Byzantine governors of Thessalonica
Byzantine prisoners and detainees
Constantine
Porphyrogennetoi
Eastern Orthodox monks
Despots (court title)
Sons of Byzantine emperors